The Women's double FITA round paraplegic was an archery competition at the 1984 Summer Paralympics.

The American archer Susan Hagel won the gold medal.

Results

References

1984 Summer Paralympics events